Ernst von Gunten (28 July 1921 – 8 November 2010) was a Swiss sprinter who competed in the 1952 Summer Olympics. He died in November 2010 at the age of 89.

References

1921 births
2010 deaths
Athletes (track and field) at the 1952 Summer Olympics
Olympic athletes of Switzerland
Swiss male sprinters